Jeffrey Lee Parker (September 7, 1964 – September 11, 2017) was an American professional ice hockey right wing.  He was drafted in the sixth round, 111th overall, by the Buffalo Sabres in the 1982 NHL Entry Draft. He played 137 games in the National Hockey League with the Sabres and four with the Hartford Whalers.

Playing career
Parker was involved in two high-profile trades over the course of his career. Following his only complete NHL season, on the day of the 1990 entry draft the Sabres traded Parker to the Winnipeg Jets along with Phil Housley and Scott Arniel for Dale Hawerchuk and an exchange of draft picks seemingly in Buffalo's favour (which became Brad May and Keith Tkachuk). In an interview shortly after the trade, Parker stated "I'm pretty happy with the trade, I'm looking forward to coming to Winnipeg because the Jets look like a team that's moving up the ladder."
   
Parker reported to Winnipeg Jets training camp in Saskatoon, Saskatchewan on September 7, 1990 in poor physical condition and ranked low in the fitness tests taken on the first day of camp. He played 5 pre-season games with the Jets, scoring two goals and earning one assist.  He and Simon Wheeldon were the last two players cut by the Jets that camp and on October 2, 1990 was assigned to the Moncton Hawks, the Jets farm team in the American Hockey League.

Devastated about being assigned to the minors, Parker sat out most of the 1990–91 season until he was picked up by the Pittsburgh Penguins as a free agent in February 1991, only to be traded to Hartford along with John Cullen and Zarley Zalapski for Ron Francis, Ulf Samuelsson and Grant Jennings on March 4, 1991. Parker only played four games for the Whalers before suffering from career-ending injuries. In his second game with the Whalers on March 12, 1991, against the Washington Capitals, he was checked into the boards and was knocked out for five minutes, resulting in a concussion. He returned to the Whalers two weeks later before sustaining a season-ending knee injury against his former team, the Sabres.

In his 141-game NHL career, Parker scored 16 goals and 19 assists for a total of 35 points.

Death
Parker died in Minneapolis on September 11, 2017, from complications of heart and lung infections. He was 53 years old. His brain was donated to Boston University to aid in chronic traumatic encephalopathy research. On May 3, 2018, it was reported that Parker had CTE when he died.

Career statistics

Regular season and playoffs

Awards and honors

References

External links
 Jeff Parker @ hockeydb.com
 Jeff Parker @ legendsofhockey.net

1964 births
2017 deaths
American men's ice hockey right wingers
Buffalo Sabres draft picks
Buffalo Sabres players
Hartford Whalers players
Ice hockey people from Saint Paul, Minnesota
Michigan State Spartans men's ice hockey players
Muskegon Lumberjacks players
NCAA men's ice hockey national champions
Rochester Americans players
Sportspeople from White Bear Lake, Minnesota